LinuxLive USB Creator is a free Microsoft Windows program that creates Live USB systems from installed images of supported Linux distributions. Due to time constraints the sole developer, Thibaut, halted support and updates for LinuxLive December 22nd, 2015.

Features
 Creates bootable Live USB of many Linux distributions 
 Makes persistent installations to save all documents created and modifications made to the system
 Run Linux directly in Microsoft Windows using Portable VirtualBox
 Mark created files as hidden
 Non-destructive installation (does not format the device)

Supported Linux distributions and variants
Linux Mint
 Kali Linux 
 Fedora
 Ubuntu, Kubuntu and Xubuntu
 Emmabuntüs
 HandyLinux
 Debian Live
 OpenSUSE
 Sabayon Linux
 Arch Linux and ArchBang
 PCLinuxOS
 CentOS
 Damn Small Linux
 Puppy Linux
 Toutou Linux
 GParted Live
 Clonezilla
 Pinguy OS
 CrunchBang Linux
 Super OS

See also
 List of tools to create Live USB systems

References

External links
  

Free system software
Live USB